Lisa Lynn Sargeant-Driscoll is a Canadian former competitive figure skater. She is the 1990 Skate Canada International silver medallist, 1991 Piruetten champion, and 1990 Canadian national champion. She placed 6th at the 1990 World Championships and 18th the following year. 

Sargeant works as a coach and choreographer in Calgary. She is the elder sister of Kristy Sargeant, a former pair skater for Canada.

Results

References

 

Canadian female single skaters
Living people
1971 births